Glass Tiger is a 2001 Hungarian comedy film.

Cast 
 Péter Rudolf - Lali
 Gábor Reviczky - Gaben
 Imre Csuja - Csoki
 Sándor Gáspár - Róka
 József Szarvas - Cingár
 Lajos Ottó Horváth - Sanyi

External links

2001 comedy films
2001 films
Hungarian comedy films
2000s Hungarian-language films